Would You Believe is a religious television series broadcast on Ireland's RTÉ One. Airing each Sunday night at 22:40, it is currently the network's longest-running documentary series.

Archive
This is an incomplete archive of programme titles and broadcast dates.

1990s

2000s
2000–2004

 
2005–2006

2006–2007

2007–2008

2008–2009

2009–2010
Fair City actor Tommy O'Neill discussed his life on 14 March 2010 episode.

All programmes from oldest to most recent online to celebrate 60 years of television Christmas 2021.

References

External links
 Would You Believe at RTÉ Television

Irish religious television series
RTÉ original programming